Cellino Attanasio  is a town and comune in  the province of Teramo, Abruzzo, central Italy.

References

External links

Cities and towns in Abruzzo